A record, recording or records may refer to:

An item or collection of data

Computing
 Record (computer science), a data structure
 Record, or row (database), a set of fields in a database related to one entity
 Boot sector or boot record, record used to start an operating system
 Storage record, a basic input/output structure

Documents
 Record, a document for administrative use
 Business record, of economic transactions
 Criminal record, a list of a person's criminal convictions
 Docket (court), the summary of proceedings in a court (US)
 Medical record, of a person's medical history and treatments
 Minutes, a summary of the proceedings at a meeting
 Public records, information that has been filed or recorded by public agencies
 Recording (real estate), the act of documenting real estate transactions
 Service record, usually associated with military service
 Transcript (law), a verbatim record of some proceedings, in particular a court transcript is a record of a law court case or similar procedure
 Archaeological record, the body of archaeological evidence
 Recorded history, a record of events that has been made for thousands of years in one form or another, e.g., oral, photographic, or written

Images
 Moving pictures, film, video, and television recordings
 Photography, photographic record
 Video recording, of both images and sounds

Sound
 Sound recording and reproduction
 Analogue recording
 Digital recording
 Phonograph record, a mechanical analog audio storage medium

Arts, entertainment, and media

Music
 Record (Tracey Thorn album)
 Records (album), a 1982 album by rock band Foreigner
 Records (song), a 2022 song by Weezer

Periodicals 
 Record (magazine), the official church paper of the South Pacific Division of Seventh-day Adventists
 Record (newspaper), a Portuguese daily sports newspaper
 Récord, a Mexican daily sports newspaper
 The Philadelphia Record, a newspaper in Philadelphia published 1877–1947
 The Yale Record, the USA's oldest college humor magazine, operated out of New Haven, Connecticut

Television
 Record News, the RecordTV's news channel 1
 RecordTV, a Brazilian TV network located in São Paulo

Sports and skills 
 FC Rekord Aleksandrov, a former Russian association football club
 Rekord Irkutsk, a Russian bandy club
 Rekord Stadium, a sports arena in Irkutsk, Russia
 Win–loss record (pitching), the number of wins and losses a baseball pitcher has accumulated
Some sports clubs take their name from this word:
 World record, an unsurpassed accomplishment or statistic on world level

Other uses 
 Record (agricultural vehicles), a Greek vehicle manufacturer
 Record (surname)
 Record (software), a music recording program
 Strengthening the reporting of observational studies in epidemiology or RECORD, statement (The REporting of Studies Conducted Using Observational Routinely-Collected Health Data)

See also 
 For the Record (disambiguation)
 Off the record (disambiguation)
 On Record (disambiguation)
 On the Record (disambiguation)
 Reckord, a surname
 Recorder (disambiguation)
 The Record (disambiguation)